Ira Robert Byock (born February 13, 1951, Newark, New Jersey) is an American physician, author, and advocate for palliative care. He is founder and chief medical officer of the Providence St. Joseph Health Institute for Human Caring in Torrance, California, and holds appointments as active emeritus professor of medicine and professor of community health and family medicine at the Geisel School of Medicine at Dartmouth College. He was director of palliative medicine at Dartmouth–Hitchcock Medical Center, from 2003–14, and associate director for patient and family-centered care at the affiliated Norris-Cotton Cancer Center.

Byock's early career focused on emergency medicine and rural practice in parallel with an interest in hospice care, and then founded the Missoula Demonstration Project and became director for the Robert Wood Johnson Promoting Excellence in End-of-Life Care initiative. His books include Dying Well (1997), The Four Things That Matter Most (2004), and The Best Care Possible (2012).

Education and medical training
Byock earned a bachelor's degree in biology from the University of Colorado, Boulder, in 1973, and Doctor of Medicine from the University of Colorado School of Medicine-Denver in 1978. He completed an internship and residency in family practice medicine in University of California–San Francisco in Fresno, California (1978–81).

He holds certifications from the American Board of Family Practice (since 1981), the American Board of Hospice and Palliative Medicine (since 1996), and the American Board of Emergency Medicine (1989–1998). He is also a Fellow of the American Academy of Family Medicine (since 1986) and the American Academy of Hospice and Palliative Medicine.

Career and professional focus

While Byock's early career focus was on rural family practice and emergency medicine, he developed an interest in the then-nascent hospice movement. While still an intern in 1978–79, Byock teamed with a social work intern to create the Esperanza Care Cooperative, a “fledgling hospice program” for Valley Medical Center in California's Central Valley.

From 1982–96 as an emergency physician, mainly in rural and small city settings in Montana, Byock maintained an interest in end-of-life care. In particular, he was interested in exploring, measuring, and developing therapeutic supports for the entirety of a person's experience of suffering, dying, and in well-being. Along with Melanie Merriman, Byock developed the Missoula-VITAS Quality of Life Index, a clinical assessment tool designed to measure subjective quality of life in persons with serious illness. The index was intended to fill a gap in clinical assessment tools, which at the time were mostly focused on physiological indicators or observable function, rather than on subjective evaluations of well-being and suffering. An insight derived from the tool's use is that subjective well-being may exist even in the presence of severe functional impairment and high symptom burden.

While among the best-rated instruments in terms of validity, including cross-cultural, the Missoula-VITAS Quality of Life Index is considered better in clinical applications, as a psychometric as well as therapeutic tool, than in research.

In 1996, Byock was asked to lead the Robert Wood Johnson Foundation's national program in Promoting Excellence in End-of-Life Care, intended to expand access to hospice and palliative care to regions and populations not easily served under the Medicare Hospice Benefit. Under Byock's leadership with deputy director, Jeanne Shields Twohig, the program directed up to $15 million over 10 years to 26 demonstration projects to develop and test models for palliative care within a variety of medical specialties, care settings, and underserved populations. Eight peer workgroups of healthcare leaders specifically focused on specific diseases or issues, while nine projects addressed knowledge and practice gaps—all under an overarching communications strategy, with significant results.

Also in 1996, with separate funding from another program area of the Robert Wood Johnson Foundation, Byock co-founded (with Barbara Spring, PhD) and served as principal investigator for the  Missoula Demonstration Project, a community organization focused on studying the experiences of illness, dying, caregiving, and grieving within the context of community, and engaging the community of Missoula, Montana in improving care and support for seriously ill people and their families.

During the 1990s, Byock helped to launch and assumed leadership roles in the American Academy of Hospice and Palliative Medicine serving on the Ethics Committee (1990–96), the Board of Directors (1990–96), as organizational secretary (1995), and as president (1997). From 1998 to 2002, he served as founding member and member of the Board of Directors and Executive Committee of the Partnership for Caring, which later became the Last Acts Partnership, also funded by the Robert Wood Johnson Foundation (RWJF). During this period, Byock had a faculty appointment at the University of Montana, Practical Ethics Center, as research professor of philosophy.

In late 2003, Byock moved to New Hampshire as director of palliative medicine for Dartmouth-Hitchcock Medical Center and associate director for patient and family-centered care at the affiliated Norris-Cotton Cancer Center. He remains an active emeritus professor of medicine and of community health and family medicine at Dartmouth's Geisel School of Medicine.

In 2014, he founded the Institute for Human Caring of Providence Health & Services in Torrance, California, where he currently serves as chief medical officer.

Opposition to physician-assisted suicide
Byock has been critical of right to die movements, physician-assisted suicide, the Oregon Death with Dignity Act, and the California End of Life Option Act.

Interviews and media appearances
Byock has appeared as a featured guest on national television and radio programs, including NPR's Talk of the Nation, All Things Considered, Fresh Air, American Public Media's On Being, CBS's 60 Minutes, ABC News Nightline, and PBS NewsHour.

Personal life
Byock is married to Yvonne Corbeil who is a nurse and currently serves as Senior Advisor for the Institute for Human Caring, Providence St. Joseph Health and Co-Director, Clinical Transformation Specialists.

Publications

Books

 The Best Care Possible: A physician’s quest to transform care through the end of life. New York: Avery, 2012.
 Dying well: The prospect for growth at the end of life. New York: Riverhead/Putnam Books, 1997.
 The Four Things That Matter Most: A book about living (2nd ed.). New York: Atria Books, a division of Simon and Schuster, 2014.
 The Four Things That Matter Most: A book about living. New York: Free Press, a division of Simon and Schuster, 2004.
 Heffner J. & I. Byock (eds). Palliative and end of life pearls. Philadelphia, PA: Hanley & Belfus, 2002.
 Staton J, Shuy R, Byock I. A few months to live: Different paths to life's end. Washington, DC: Georgetown University Press, 2001.

References

External links
 Profile, IraByock.org
 The Four Things That Matter Most, WikiSummaries.org

Geisel School of Medicine faculty
American palliative care physicians
Living people
1951 births
American healthcare managers